Laura Kivelä (born 4 May 1952) is a Finnish diver. She competed in two events at the 1972 Summer Olympics.

References

External links
 

1952 births
Living people
Finnish female divers
Olympic divers of Finland
Divers at the 1972 Summer Olympics
Divers from Helsinki